En carne vive is a 1954 Argentine film directed by Enrique Cahen Salaberry and starring Alberto Closas and Ana Mariscal.

Cast
 Ana Mariscal		
 Alberto Closas		
 Georges Rivière
 Nelly Meden		
 Nicolás Fregues		
 Ángeles Martínez		
 Eduardo Naveda		
 Isabel Pradas		
 Víctor Martucci		
 Panchito Lombard		
 Raquel Benet		
 Marisa Núñez		
 Eduardo Norevo		
 Alberto Lagos		
 Julio Bianquet		
 Pablo Cumo		
 Félix Tortorelli		
 Justo Martínez		
 Tomás Alonso		
 Arturo Arcari		
 Martha Atoche		
 Roberto Contreras		
 Carmen Lloveras		
 Jorge Morales		
 André Norevó		
 Marcela Sola	
 Marcelo Sosa		
 Alba Varela

External links

References

1954 films
1950s Spanish-language films
Argentine black-and-white films
Films directed by Enrique Cahen Salaberry
Argentine drama films
1954 drama films
1950s Argentine films